Xue Zongzheng (born 1935) is a Chinese historian, a director of Ancient History at the Institute of History in Xinjiang Academy of Social Sciences, and a professor of History at Xinjiang Normal University. Born in Jinan, Shandong, he graduated with a history degree from Peking University in 1958, specializing in frontier policies of ancient China and the history of Central Asia. He published several books in Chinese.

Publications
 A History of Turks. Beijing: Chinese Social Sciences Press. 1992. (“突厥史" 中国社会科学出版社 1992年)
 A Study of Western Boundary's Frontier Poetry in the Past Dynasties. Lanzhou: Dunhuang Literature and Art Press. 1993. ("历代西陲边塞诗研究" 敦煌文艺出版社 1993年)
 Anxi and Beiting Protectorates. Harbin: Heilongjiang Education Press. 1995. ("安西与北庭" 黑龙江教育出版社 1995年)
 Rise and Decline of Tubo Kingdom. Beijing: Nationalities Press. 1997. ("吐蕃王国的兴衰" 民族出版社 1997年)
 The Pronunciation of the Han and Jin Dynasties and the Toponym of the Ancient Western Region. Journal of Xinjiang University. 2000.1. ("汉晋古音与古西域地名" 新疆大学学报 2000年01期)
 Xinjiang's Historical Events Listed in Divani Lugatit Turk. Journal of Xinjiang University. 2001.1 ("《突厥语词典》中的新疆史事" 新疆大学学报 2001年01期)
 A Study on Multilateral Relations Among the Tibetan, Uighur and Karluk — On the Contend in the Western Regions After An and Shi's Rebellions of the Tang Dynasty. 2001.3 ("吐蕃、回鹘、葛逻禄的多边关系考述 — 关于唐安史乱后的西域角逐" 西域研究 2001年03期)
 A History of On Oq Khans in the Late Western Turks. Journal of Xinjiang Normal University. 2001.4. ("后西突厥两厢可汗始末" 新疆师范大学学报 2001年04期)
 The Royal Gar and the Tibetan-Subjected Western Turkic Regimes — With the Discussion About the Contend Between Tang Dynasty and the Tibetan in the Western Region. China's Borderland History and Geography Studies. 2002.4. ("噶尔家族与附蕃西突厥诸政权 — 兼论唐与吐蕃间的西域角逐" 中国边疆史地研究 2002年04期)
From Shule to Jiashizhili. Xinjiang Academy of Social Sciences. 2005.2. ("从疏勒到伽师祗离" 新疆社会科学 2005年02期)

References

1935 births
Living people
People's Republic of China historians
Writers from Jinan
Peking University alumni
Historians from Shandong
Educators from Shandong
Academic staff of Xinjiang Normal University